Goalball event at the 2015 Parapan American Games was played from 8–15 August 2015 at the Mississauga Sports Centre in Toronto.

Participating nations

Men

Group stage

Semifinals

Bronze Medal match

Gold Medal match

Women

Group stage

Semifinals

Bronze Medal match

Gold Medal match

Medal summary

Medal table

Medal events

References

External links
 Goalball Results

Events at the 2015 Parapan American Games